Vaðlaheiðargöng is a toll tunnel in the north of Iceland along Route 1, just east of Akureyri. It passes between Eyjafjörður and Fnjóskadalur. The tunnel shortens the travel between Akureyri and Husavik by 16 km. As of 2022, it is the only toll road in Iceland.

The tunnel's construction was delayed by two water ingress incidents, one being of geothermal hot water. Due to this, temperatures inside the tunnel rise up to 22-26 °C in the warmest sections, and one of the tunnel's emergency laybys have even been used for hot yoga. The hot water found is used in a local geothermal spa, a few kilometres south of the tunnel.

Construction and Cost 
The estimated cost of the tunnel was ISK 11.5 billion (2013 prices, about US$96 million) but by April 2017, it was reported that the costs had surpassed the estimates by 44%. The Icelandic government loaned 4.7 billion ISK to the construction of the project in April 2017.

The tunnel was planned to open at the end of 2016. However, a large cold water leak was found in early 2015 and large supports needed to be put in place. Adding to the problems, a large volume of hot water was also found and needed to be pumped out of the tunnel. The tunnel was scheduled to open in the fall of 2018. As of April 2017, the tunnel had been drilled, but finishing up and building the road remained.

The tunnel opened on 21 December 2018.

Water utilization 
The two water ingresses encountered during the construction of the tunnel were contained and conduits were placed in the tunnel to its western entrance (Akureyri side). The hot water found in 2014 had a volumetric flow of 350L/s of 50 °C and around 500L/s of cold water was found separately in 2015. Initially the hot water was discharged into the sea just west of the tunnel, creating a small tourist attraction of its own, with locals bathing in the hot waterfall by the shore. The local utility, Norðurorka, plans to use the cold water for the local area, including Akureyri in future.

In 2017, a local competition was launched to find the best use of the hot water. It was announced in 2020 that the water will be used for a geothermal spa, called 'Forest Lagoon', opened in 2022. It will be located a few kilometers south of the tunnel in Eyjarfjarðarsveit.

Toll 
The tunnel uses automatic number-plate recognition to collect tolls and is completely unmanned and has no toll collection booths. Users either register on their website and pay, or, after 24 hours the toll is invoiced to the owner through their vehicle registration plate, incurring a collection fee of 400 ISK. The tolls as of February 2022 are:

The initial collection fee was 1,000 ISK if the toll was not paid within three hours. This was controversial as tourists and non-regular users were unaware of the system, and was later reduced to the current 400 ISK and grace period increased to 24 hours.

In July 2019, it was reported that the toll tunnel had earned 35-40% less than estimated. This was because fewer cars went through the tunnel than expected and because more drivers paid in advance than was expected.

Reception 
The construction of the tunnel and the Icelandic government's role has been controversial. Opponents of the project have said that the project will not be profitable within a reasonable span of time (or at all), that construction costs would exceed original estimates and that the motivation behind the construction is to benefit the voting demographic in a marginal constituency.

References

Road tunnels in Iceland
Buildings and structures in Northeastern Region (Iceland)